The members of the 13th General Assembly of Newfoundland were elected in the Newfoundland general election held in November 1878. The general assembly sat from 1879 to 1882.

The Conservative Party led by William Whiteway formed the government.

A.J.W. McNeilly was chosen as speaker.

Sir John Hawley Glover served as colonial governor of Newfoundland until 1881. Henry Berkeley Fitzhardinge Maxse succeeded Glover as governor.

Members of the Assembly 
The following members were elected to the assembly in 1878:

Notes:

By-elections 
None

References 

Newfoundland
Terms of the General Assembly of Newfoundland and Labrador